The Dyagilevo and Engels air bases attacks are an alleged shelling by Ukrainian forces of the Engels Air Base in  Saratov Oblast and Dyagilevo Air Base in Ryazan Oblast, which took place on December 5, 2022, and December 26, 2022, during the 2022 Russian invasion of Ukraine.

Course of events 
On the morning of December 5, 2022, the residents of the city of Engels reported hearing explosions. At 9 A.M, the governor of the Saratov region said that there were no casualties, and no civilian objects were damaged. Later, two Tu-95 aircraft were seriously damaged. That same morning, an attack on the Diaghilev air base was reported. A Tu-22M3 was damaged and a fuel tanker exploded, 3 people were killed and 6 people were injured.

On December 26, there was a repeated attack on the Engels air base, which caused the death of three officers of the Russian Armed Forces. According to the Ministry of Defense of Russia, no aviation equipment was damaged.

References 

Airstrikes during the 2022 Russian invasion of Ukraine
Aerial bombing